Eodorcadion oligocarinatum is a species of beetle in the family Cerambycidae. It was described by Mikhail Leontievich Danilevsky in 2007.

References

Dorcadiini
Beetles described in 2007